Herbert Steinbeißer (born 8 January 1938) is a German cross-country skier. He competed at the 1964 Winter Olympics and the 1968 Winter Olympics.

References

External links
 

1938 births
Living people
German male cross-country skiers
Olympic cross-country skiers of the United Team of Germany
Olympic cross-country skiers of West Germany
Cross-country skiers at the 1964 Winter Olympics
Cross-country skiers at the 1968 Winter Olympics
People from Traunstein (district)
Sportspeople from Upper Bavaria
20th-century German people